John William Barrie Devenport  (7 October 1935 – 25 July 2010, often mistakenly reported as "Barrie Davenport") was a New Zealand swimmer and lifesaver who was the first person in modern history to swim Cook Strait.

Devenport was born in Wellington on 7 October 1935. On 20 November 1962, at the age of 27, he swam from Cape Terawhiti in the North Island to Wellington Rock in the South Island in 11 hours, 13 minutes. He was inducted into the New Zealand Sports Hall of Fame in 1995.

He died in 2010 on the Gold Coast, Australia, after an 18-month battle with cancer.

References
 

1935 births
2010 deaths
New Zealand male swimmers
Swimmers from Wellington City
Deaths from cancer in Queensland
Male long-distance swimmers
New Zealand long-distance swimmers
Cook Strait swimmers
20th-century New Zealand people
21st-century New Zealand people